Putugal, also known as kuih putugal or kuih Portugal, is a Eurasian steamed rice cake or kuih that appears in all the former Portuguese territories of Asia. Putugal is typically made from rice or tapioca flour traditionally colored blue using the butterfly pea flower, stuffed with ripened banana and garnished with grated coconut. Among Eurasians, the dessert is a staple during festive celebrations such as Christmas.

See also 

 Eurasians in Singapore

References 

Eurasian cuisine of Singapore
Malaysian cuisine
Malaysian fusion cuisine
Rice cakes
Steamed foods
Foods containing coconut